John Jewsbury Bradley (April 20, 1869 – May 21, 1948) was a United States Army officer and a Brigadier general who commanded the Eighth Infantry Division during World War I.

Early life 
Bradley was born in Lake View, Illinois. He graduated from the United States Military Academy in 1891 and was commissioned in the Fourteenth Infantry. On September 14, 1893, Bradley married Caroline Sladen, daughter of Medal of Honor recipient Joseph A. Sladen and sister of Fred Winchester Sladen. They had three children: Frances Bradley, John J. Bradley Jr., and Joseph S. Bradley.

Military career 
Bradley served overseas in the Philippine insurrection, for which he received the Purple Heart Medal and a Silver Star Medal, as well as in China.

In 1912, he graduated from the Army School of Line and in the following year he graduated from the Army Staff College. Bradley served on the War Department General Staff in 1917 and 1918 which earned him a Distinguished Service Medal.

On June 26, 1918, he was promoted to brigadier general. He was sent to France along with the American Expeditionary Forces and commanded a brigade of the 82nd Infantry Division. In November 1918, Bradley commanded the Eighth Infantry Division.

Awards 
Along with his medals from the United States, Bradley would also receive the Officer of the Legion of Honor from France, the Companion of the Order of St Michael and St George from England, and the  Commander of the Order of the Crown from Italy.

Death and legacy
Bradley retired as a colonel in 1927 due to disabilities, but went on to practice law in the state of New York. He was advanced to brigadier general on the retired list in 1930. Bradley became a trustee of the Disabled American Veterans Service Foundation. He also belonged to the Military Order of the World Wars, Guards' Club in London, and Army and Navy Club (Washington, D.C.). Bradley died on May 21, 1948 in Detroit, Michigan, at the age of seventy-nine. Bradley and his wife Caroline were buried at the West Point Cemetery.

References

Bibliography 
Davis, Henry Blaine. Generals in Khaki. Raleigh, NC: Pentland Press, 1998.  
Marquis Who's Who, Inc. Who Was Who in American History, the Military. Chicago: Marquis Who's Who, 1975.

External links 

 

1869 births
1948 deaths
Military personnel from Chicago
United States Military Academy alumni
United States Army Infantry Branch personnel
American military personnel of the Philippine–American War
Recipients of the Silver Star
United States Army Command and General Staff College alumni
United States Army generals of World War I
United States Army generals
New York (state) lawyers
Burials at West Point Cemetery